Bethlehem Abbey in the village of Bonheiden, Belgium, is a house of Benedictine nuns of the Subiaco Cassinese Congregation. The monastery was built in 1965 as a Redemptorist house but was transferred to the Benedictines in 1975.

The community formerly ran a publishing imprint which produced Dutch translations of the writings of Basil of Caesarea and Athanasius of Alexandria.

Since 30 May 2015 the Benedictines have shared the monastery buildings with a lay community (the Moriya Community).

References

1965 establishments in Belgium
1975 establishments in Belgium
Benedictine monasteries in Belgium
20th-century Christian monasteries
Bonheiden